A control lock, guard lock or stop lock differs from a normal canal lock in that its primary purpose is controlling variances in water level rather than raising or lowering vessels. A control lock may also be known as a tide lock where it is used to control seawater entering into a body of fresh water.

Examples

The T. J. O’Brien Lock and Dam at Chicago, Illinois is a guard lock that controls the outflow of water from Lake Michigan into the Illinois Waterway while locking vessels through between the waterway and Lake Michigan.

Lock 8 near the south end of the Welland Canal at Port Colborne, Ontario, Canada is a guard lock. Due to the large expanse of shallow water in Lake Erie, changes in wind direction and force create water level changes as great as 11 feet (3.4 m) at Port Colborne. Lock 8 controls the water level in the canal, keeping it independent of the fluctuations of Lake Erie, but allows ships to enter Lake Erie regardless of its level.

References

Locks (water navigation)